Murik is a language of Sarawak, Malaysia.

References

External links 
 Murik written materials are available through Kaipuleohone

Languages of Malaysia
Kayan–Murik languages
Endangered Austronesian languages